Grigory Vyacheslavovich Sartakov  (born 19 August 1994) is a Kazakh footballer who plays as a defender.

Career

Club
On 13 January 2019, Sartakov signed a new two-year contract with FC Tobol. On 4 February 2020, Sartakov was released by Tobol. After spells at Irtysh Pavlodar and FC Okzhetpes in 2020, Sartakov joined FC Aksu in March 2021.

Career statistics

Club

International

Statistics accurate as of match played 22 March 2017

References 

Living people
1994 births
Kazakhstani footballers
Kazakhstan international footballers
People from Pavlodar
Association football defenders
Kazakhstan Premier League players
FC Spartak Semey players
FC Irtysh Pavlodar players
FC Tobol players
FC Okzhetpes players